Worms is a 2013 stop-motion animated adventure fantasy comedy film directed by Paolo Conti and Arthur Nunes. It is the first Brazilian stop-motion animated film. It was released in Brazil on December 20, 2013.

Plot
When Junior, an overprotected preteen worm, is accidentally brought up to the surface, he must face a risky journey back home.

Cast
 Cadu Paschoal as Junior
 Jullie as Linda
 Yago Machado as Nico
 Rita Lee as Martha
 Anderson Silva as Hairy (Cabelo)
 Daniel Boaventura as Big Wig / Mister Jumping
 Isabella Fiorentino as Florence
 Duda Espinoza as Noodles
 Luiz Sérgio Navarro as Arthur
 Manolo Rey as Ranho
 Sérgio Stern as François

Notes

References

External links 
 
 

Brazilian animated films
2010s stop-motion animated films
Canadian animated feature films
2013 animated films
2013 films
20th Century Fox animated films
20th Century Fox films
Animated films about animals
2010s Canadian films
2010s American films